Calling may refer to:

 Religious calling, a religious vocation
 Effectual calling, a theological term
 Vocation, or occupation
 Audible animal communication, including mate calling and territorial threat sounds
 Game call, a device that is used to mimic animal communication noises to attract or drive animals to a hunter

Arts and entertainment
 Calling (EP), a 2007 EP by Japanese band Unsraw
 Calling (Kobukuro album), a 2009 album by Kobukuro
 "Calling" (Geri Halliwell song), 2001
 "Calling" (Arashi song), 2013
 "Calling" (B'z song), 1997
 "Calling" (Taproot song), 2005
 "Calling" (Vamps song), 2017
 "Calling" (Coldrain song), 2022
 "Calling", a 2021 song by Rod Wave, from SoulFly
 "Calling", a 2014 song by Pink Floyd, from The Endless River
 "Calling (Lose My Mind)", a 2012 single by Sebastian Ingrosso and Alesso
 Calling (video game), a 2009 horror video game for the Wii
 "Calling", a song for the 2007 game The World Ends with You
 "Calling", a 1986 song by Status Quo from In the Army Now

See also 

 Call (disambiguation)
 The Calling (disambiguation)